Nefertiti (c. 1370 BC – c. 1330 BC) was the Great Royal Wife of Egyptian pharaoh Akhenaten.

Nefertiti may also refer to:

Art, entertainment, and media

Film
Nefertiti, Queen of the Nile (1961), an Italian sword-and-sandal historical drama
Nefertiti, figlia del sole (1994), an Italian film directed by Guy Gilles

Music
Nefertiti (Andrew Hill album), a 1976 album by Andrew Hill
Nefertiti (Miles Davis album), a 1968 album by Miles Davis
"Nefertiti", a composition by Wayne Shorter featured on the Miles Davis album 
Nefertiti, the Beautiful One Has Come, a 1963 album by the Cecil Taylor Unit

Other
Nefertiti A. Walker, American college basketball player and Interim Vice Chancellor at the Isenberg School of Management
Nefertiti piercing, a form of female genital piercing

See also

Nefertari, Great Royal Wife of Ramesses the Great
1068 Nofretete, a minor planet orbiting the Sun